Bidding for the 2018 Commonwealth Games began on 31 March 2010. The winning bid was announced in Basseterre, Saint Kitts on 11 November 2011. Gold Coast won its bid to host the 2018 Commonwealth Games.

Bidding Process

Bidding Timeline

2010
31 March 2010 – Deadline for CGA's/Candidate Cities to notify of intention to bid
16 April 2010 – Payment of Candidate City Fee for assessment and support of lodgement of original copy of Candidate Procedure Acceptance
Last week April 2010 – Meeting of all Candidate Cities in London
30 June 2010 – Signed return of Host City Contracts in London
October 2010 – Candidate City Observers Program in Delhi
November/December 2010 – Delhi 2010 Debriefing and Candidate City Seminar in Delhi
2011
February 2011 – CGF- Candidate City Meeting 
11 May 2011 – Bid Lodging Deadline  
June/July 2011 – Evaluation commission visits Candidate City  
September 2011 – Publishing of Evaluation Report in London
October 2011 – Deadline for Candidate City Bid Changes in London
11 November 2011 – Bid Election in Basseterre, Saint Kitts and Nevis

Vote 
On 11 November 2011, Gold Coast won its bid to host the Commonwealth Games.

Cities that were considered 
Two cities submitted bids to host the 2018 Commonwealth Games that were recognised by the CGF. The two cities were Gold Coast (Australia) and Hambantota (Sri Lanka).

Proposed bids which did not go to application 
These cities launched bids or indicated interest, but ultimately did not bid .
  Adelaide, Australia 
State Opposition Leader Martin Hamilton-Smith committed to a bid for the 2018 Commonwealth Games if the Liberals were elected in 2010. However, the bid would have needed to be made before the poll. The government ruled the option out, with the then treasurer, Kevin Foley, labeling the Commonwealth games a "B" grade event. On 28 November 2008, Adelaide withdrew, with State Sport Minister Michael Wright blaming budgetary pressures. Projects such as Marjorie Jackson-Nelson Hospital (since renamed to the new Royal Adelaide Hospital, the desalination plant, and transport were deemed more pressing.
  Perth, Australia 
Perth confirmed in 2009 that it would not pursue a bid to hold the games in 2018.
  Abuja, Nigeria 
Abuja bid for the 2014 Commonwealth Games, and finished runners-up. They also announced an intention to bid, but did not do so at the deadline.
  Auckland, New Zealand 
Auckland's bid to stage the 2018 Commonwealth Games ended when the government of New Zealand announced they will not provide financial support to stage the games. The Prime Minister of New Zealand John Key confirmed that the government would not back Auckland's bid. Key said that the issue was not the cost of the bid itself, but how much it would cost to run the event. He said New Zealand would face a NZ$600 million loss, even taking into account benefits such as increased tourism, if it were to go ahead.
  Christchurch, New Zealand 
According to a 2009 report by Radio New Zealand, Christchurch City Council withdrew from bidding for the 2018 games.
  Port of Spain, Trinidad and Tobago 
Port of Spain launched a bid, but ultimately the Trinidad and Tobago Commonwealth Games Association decided not to proceed with the process. The country later won the right to host the 2021 Commonwealth Youth Games in the same city.

References

External links
 CGF Evaluation Commission Report

Commonwealth Games bids
2018 Commonwealth Games